My Number: The Anthology is a Girl compilation album.

These cult heroes from the new wave of British heavy metal featured future L.A. Guns singer Phil Lewis on lead vocals and future Def Leppard star Phil Collen on guitar. The anthology consists of material recorded for Jet, including from their hit LPs Sheer Greed and Wasted Youth, and many rare B-sides and live recordings.

Track information

Disc 1

  "My Number"    
  "Do You Love Me" (Kiss Cover)   
  "Strawberries"    
  "Hollywood Tease"    
  "You Really Got Me"    
  "Love Is a Game"    
  "Little Miss Anne"    
  "The Things That You Say"        
  "Lovely Lorraine"    
  "Doctor Doctor"    
  "Heartbreak America"
  "Old Dogs"
  "Passing Clouds"
  "Thru The Twilight"
  "McKitty's Back"
  "Ice in the Blood"
  "Wasted Youth"
  "Nice 'N' Nasty"
  "19"
  "Overnight Angels"

Disc 2
 
  "Naughty Boy"    
  "Killing Time"        
  "The Sound of Cars"        
  "White Prophet"       
  "Big Night Out"        
  "I Got Love"        
  "Mad For It"     
  "Green Light"    
  "King Rat"    
  "Your Really Got Me"
  "Ice In The Blood" (Live)
  "Icey Blue" (Live)
  "Big Night" (Live)
  "Sweet Kids" (Live)
  "Nice 'N' Nasty" (Live)
  "Thru The Twilite" (Live)
  "Family At War" (Live)

Additional Information
 
 Studio or Live:  Studio/Live
 Product Classification:  Standard
 Length:  128.15
 Net Weight:  157
 Catalogue:  CMDDD363
 Barcode:  5050159136322
 Product ID:  17372969

References

2001 compilation albums
Girl (band) albums